Saint George's Church (Surb Gevorg yekeghetsi; , sur′pgevork′i) is a 13th-century Armenian church in the old city of Tbilisi, Georgia's capital. It is one of the two functioning Armenian churches in Tbilisi and is the cathedral of the Georgian Diocese of the Armenian Apostolic Church. It is located in the south-western corner of Vakhtang Gorgasali Square (Meidani) and is overlooked by the ruins of Narikala fortress.

History 

According to the Tbilisi municipality website, the area where the church is located used to belong to the prison district during the Middle Ages, hence the occasional Georgian name, Tsikhisdidi (tsikhe = prison, didi = big).

According to Armenian historians Hovsep Orbeli and Levon Melikset-Bek, the church was founded in 1251. The date was proposed based on an Arabic inscription on a khachkar over the western door of the church yard. According to 13th century chronicler Hovhannes Erznkatsi, the church was built by Prince Umek of Karin (Erzurum). According to Jean-Michel Thierry,  Umek was a wealthy merchant who settled in Tiflis, and married Princess Mama Vahtangian, the daughter of Hasan Jalal Vahtangian, Grand Prince of Khachen (ruled 1214–61). However, the Diocese of the Armenian Apostolic Church in Georgia website claims that the church existed long before the 13th century and that Erznkatsi refers to the church being rebuilt and not being built by Umek. According to the Armenian Diocese, the church may have been founded as early as 631.

The church was given to the Persian garrison by Safavid Shah Abbas I of Persia in 1616 and returned to the Armenian community in 1748 by King Heraclius II of Georgia. It was burnt when Persians sacked Tbilisi in 1795. The church was thoroughly restored in the 17th century, and then again in 1832 and 1881. 

It became the seat of the Georgian Diocese of the Armenian Apostolic Church after the Vank Cathedral was demolished by Soviet authorities in the 1930s.

The most recent renovation of the church began in 2012. Initiated and financed by Russian-Armenian businessman Ruben Vardanian, the renovation was supported by donations of philanthropists Albert Avdolyan, Sergey Sarkisov and Rusudan Makhashvili, Danil Khachaturov, former Georgian Prime Minister Bidzina Ivanishvili, and others. Some $3.5 million was spent on its renovation, which was completed in 2015. The church was reconsecrated on October 31, 2015 by Catholicos Karekin II, the head of the Armenian Church. The ceremony was attended by Armenian President Serzh Sargsyan and Ivanishvili.

In February 2019 a video surfaced online showing three ethnic Azerbaijanis, one of them burning the flag of Armenia (but more similar to flag of Columbia) in front of the church. An Armenian diocese spokesperson said the incident had occurred months earlier.

Architecture and frescoes 
The church is built on a traditional plan of a partitioned, open cross with a rectangular perimeter. Like most of the churches in Tbilisi, it is built in brick. The outer walls of the church are covered with stucco.

Late 18th-century paintings by Hovnatan Hovnatanian decorate the church's interior. Between 1922 and 1923 Gevorg Bashinjaghian decorated the church's internal walls, the altar, and the walls in front of it, creating four large murals: Jesus in the Garden of Gethsemane, The Repentance of Judas, Jesus and the Boatmen, Harvest time.

Burials

The following people are buried at the church courtyard:
Sayat-Nova (d. 1795), poet and musician
Gevorg Bashinjaghian (d. 1925), painter
Including the following Russian generals of Armenian origin:
Beybut Shelkovnikov (d. 1878)
Ivan (Hovhannes) Lazarev (d. 1879)
Arshak Ter-Gukasov (d. 1881)
Mikhail Loris-Melikov (d. 1888)

Gallery

See also 

Armenians in Georgia
Armenians in Tbilisi
Armenian churches of Tbilisi

References

Armenian churches in Tbilisi
Armenian Apostolic cathedrals in Georgia (country)
Armenian Apostolic churches in Tbilisi
Old Tbilisi